A dog and pony show is a highly promoted performance or event designed to sway opinion.

Dog and pony show may also refer to:
 "A Dog and Pony Show" (Homicide: Life on the Street), a first-season episode of Homicide: Life on the Street
 "The Dog and Pony Show" (1977), a fourth-season episode of The Rockford Files
 "The Dog and Pony Show" (1997), a third-season episode of The Drew Carey Show
 "The Dog & Pony Show" (2020), a Canadian-American children's animated television series created by Josh Selig and produced by RedKnot with assistance from Corus Entertainment and Little Airplane Productions
 "A Dog and Pony Show", episode 19 of the first season of My Little Pony: Friendship is Magic

See also
 The Last Dog and Pony Show, the fourth solo album by Bob Mould